Catherine Beattie may refer to:
 Catherine Beattie (politician)
 Catherine Beattie (bowls)